Leroy Lansing Janes (1838–1909) was an American educator, hired by Kumamoto Domain in early Meiji period Japan.

A native of Ohio, Janes was a veteran of the Civil War, where he served in the artillery with the rank of captain after graduation from the United States Military Academy at West Point. Janes established a curriculum entirely in English, covering mathematics, history, geography and natural sciences. Janes lectured on western morals, and waited for three years to broach the subject of Christianity with his students, when he felt that he had gained their trust and that their English abilities were sufficient to understand the relationship between Christianity and western civilization.

The Kumamoto Yōgakkō was forced to close in August 1876 due to opposition from conservative elements within Kumamoto domain, and Janes, together with his students, relocated to Kyoto, where they joined the Dōshisha school, which had been founded a year earlier by Niijima Jō. Janes returned to the United States in 1878.

Janes returned to Japan to teach again from 1893 to 1899 as an oyatoi gaikokujin.

References
Andersen, Gerald H. Biographical Directory of Christian Missions. Wm. B. Eerdmans Publishing Co (1999). 
Furuya, Yasuo. A History of Japanese Theology. Wm. B. Eerdmans Publishing Co (2001). 
Notehelfer. F.G. American Samurai : Captain L.L. Janes and Japan, Princeton University Press 1985, 
Pyle, Kenneth B. The new generation in Meiji Japan: problems of cultural identity, 1885-1895. Stanford University Press (1969). 

Foreign advisors to the government in Meiji-period Japan
American expatriates in Japan
Protestant missionaries in Japan
Foreign educators in Japan
1838 births
1909 deaths
American Protestant missionaries
Missionary educators
Union Army officers
United States Army officers